Miguel Silveira dos Santos (born 26 March 2003), simply known as Miguel, is a Brazilian footballer who plays as an attacking midfielder for Russian club Sochi.

Club career

Early career
Born in Vila Velha, Espírito Santo, Miguel began his career with local side Desportiva Ferroviária before joining Fluminense at the age of ten. Despite winning minor youth titles with Flu, he moved to Vasco da Gama in 2015, but only stayed 11 months at the latter before returning to his previous club.

Fluminense
In April 2019, aged just 16, Miguel was called up to train with the first team by manager Fernando Diniz. He made his professional debut on 6 June, coming on as a late substitute for Nino in a 2–2 away draw against Cruzeiro, for the year's Copa do Brasil; aged 16 years, two months and ten days, he became the youngest player to debut for Flu in the professional era, and the tenth overall.

One day after his debut, Miguel signed his first professional contract with Fluminense, after agreeing to a three-year deal. He made his Série A debut on 15 July, replacing fellow youth graduate João Pedro late into a 1–1 home draw against Ceará.

On 8 May 2021, Miguel took a legal action against Fluminense to rescind his contract, alleging unpaid wages. On 11 August, he was declared a free agent after winning the Court action; Fluminense also released a note stating that the club will appeal the decision.

In September 2021, Miguel and Fluminense reached an agreement, with the club keeping 30% of the player's economic rights.

Red Bull Bragantino
On 24 September 2021, Red Bull Bragantino officially announced the signing of Miguel on a contract until December 2022. He only made his debut for the club the following 27 January, playing the last nine minutes in a 3–1 Campeonato Paulista away loss against Mirassol.

Miguel scored his first senior goal on 6 February 2022, netting the opener in a 1–1 draw at Ferroviária. On 14 November, after featuring sparingly, he left the club after Braga announced that his contract would not be renewed.

Personal life
Miguel has been Nike-sponsored since the age of 13.

Career statistics

Club

References

External links

2003 births
Sportspeople from Espírito Santo
Living people
Brazilian footballers
Brazil youth international footballers
Association football midfielders
Fluminense FC players
Red Bull Bragantino players
PFC Sochi players
Campeonato Brasileiro Série A players
Brazilian expatriate footballers
Expatriate footballers in Russia
Brazilian expatriate sportspeople in Russia